Synchlora fringillata is a moth in the  family Geometridae. It is found in Brazil.  The type was found in the state of Paraná.

References

External links
 entomology.si.edu: pictures of type

Synchlorini
Moths described in 1897